The Minotaur is a mythological monster, half-man and half-bull.

Minotaur may also refer to:

In military
Minotaur (rocket family), an American rocket designed to launch small satellites
HMS Minotaur, a historical ship name of the Royal Navy
MI AC Disp F1 Minotaur mine, a French scatterable anti-tank mine
Minotaur class battleship, enlarged versions of HMS Achilles with heavier armament and armour, and more powerful engines
Minotaur class cruiser (disambiguation), two classes of cruisers of the Royal Navy
USS Minotaur (ARL-15), an Achelous-class landing craft repair ship

Art and entertainment

Film, television and theatre
Minotaur (film), a 2006 horror film
Minotaur, the Wild Beast of Crete, a 1960 Italian film
The Minotaur (opera), a 2008 opera by Harrison Birtwistle
"Minotaur" (Fear the Walking Dead), a television episode
 Minotaur, a Brazilian combat robot competing in BattleBots

Games 
Minotaur: The Labyrinths of Crete, a 1992 computer game

Literature
Minotaur (novel), a 1981 novel by Benjamin Tammuz
The Minotaur, a 1989 spy thriller novel by Stephen Coonts
The Minotaur (novel), a 2005 novel by Barbara Vine (Ruth Rendell)
Minotaur (comics), different fictional characters appearing in comic books published by Marvel Comics
Minotaur (New-Gen), a fictional superhero in the NEW-GEN comic books published by Marvel Comics
"The Minotaur", a chapter in the Tanglewood Tales by Nathaniel Hawthorne

Music
Minotaur (Pixies album), 2009
Minotaur (The Clientele album), 2010
"The Minotaur", a Moog instrumental by Dick Hyman, 1969
"Minotaur", a song by Photek from Modus Operandi, 1997

Painting
The Minotaur (painting), an 1885 painting by George Frederic Watts

In people
"The Minotaur", the ringname of professional wrestler Steve DiSalvo (born 1949) during his run in World Championship Wrestling
"Minotauro", the ringname of Brazilian mixed martial artist Antônio Rodrigo Nogueira (born 1976)

In other uses
Minotaur International, an international distributor of British television programmes owned by Virgin Media
Minotaur, the early development name of the application which became Mozilla Thunderbird
Minotaure, a French surrealist magazine
Minotaur beetle (Typhaeus typhoeus)